Lane Burroughs is an American college baseball coach, currently serving as head coach of the Louisiana Tech Bulldogs baseball program.  He was previously the head coach at Northwestern State, named to that position prior to the 2013 season.

Burroughs played for two seasons at Meridian Community College while earning an associate degree, then completed his eligibility and bachelor's at Mississippi College.  While completing a master's degree at Mississippi College, he served as a graduate assistant coach with the Choctaws, then served for one season at East Mississippi Community College and one season at Northwestern State as an assistant coach.  Burroughs then worked for eight years at Southern Miss, where he helped lead the Golden Eagles to six NCAA Regional appearances.  He served in a variety of roles: third base coach, hitting coach, infielders coach, and recruiting coordinator.  He then moved to Kansas State for one season, during which the Wildcats reached the 2008 Big 12 Tournament final.  Burroughs accepted an assistant coaching position at Mississippi State, where he remained for four seasons before being named to his first head coaching position at Northwestern State in June 2012.

Head coaching record

See also
 List of current NCAA Division I baseball coaches

References

External links
 Louisiana Tech profile

Year of birth missing (living people)
Living people
Kansas State Wildcats baseball coaches
Louisiana Tech Bulldogs baseball coaches
Meridian Eagles baseball players
Mississippi College Choctaws baseball coaches
Mississippi College Choctaws baseball players
Mississippi State Bulldogs baseball coaches
Northwestern State Demons baseball coaches
Southern Miss Golden Eagles baseball coaches
People from Collinsville, Mississippi